The National Museum of Military Vehicles is a military history museum in Dubois, Wyoming.

Established in 2020, the  museum was founded by Dan and Cynthia Starks and built between May 2017 and August 2020. More than 500 military vehicles and a significant firearms collection are on display at the museum along with other artifacts. Starks, a former lawyer and medical industry CEO, funded the $100 million museum.

Items on display include hardware ranging from the Spanish American War up until the Global War on Terror. The museum contains four main galleries and an outdoor "Wall of Reflection".

A second major building on campus, The Poolaw Building, opened in Sept., 2022. The building is named after First Lieutenant Pascal C. Poolaw Sr., who served with the United States Army in World War II, the Korean War, and the Vietnam War. He is the United States' most decorated American Indian, with 42 medals and citations, including four Silver Stars, five Bronze Stars, as well as three Purple Hearts – one for each war.

Inside, guests will find the Karl Smith collection - a world-class, extensive review of U.S. bayonets, muskets and swords; an Assembly Room with high-tech audio and video and seating for up to 500; The Canteen, a food court for guests; a commercial kitchen and administrative offices.

References

External links 	
 
 CNET: https://www.cnet.com/culture/so-long-and-tanks-for-all-the-tanks-touring-the-museum-of-military-vehicles/
 Veteran Life: https://veteranlife.com/lifestyle/national-museum-of-military-vehicles/

Automotive museums in Wyoming
Military and war museums in Wyoming

Museum on Fox Nation: Hidden Gems: